Kim Sung-keun (Hangul: 김성근, Hanja: 金星根) (born December 13, 1942, in Kyoto, Japan) is a retired South Korean left-handed baseball pitcher and KBO League manager. Over the course of his managerial career, Kim managed seven different KBO League teams, and is only the second manager in the history of the league to record 1,000 victories. He is a four-time KBO Manager of the Year, and as manager of the SK Wyverns led the team to victory in the Korean Series three times. His nickname is the "Baseball God."

Biography 
Kim spent his childhood as a resident of Japan and adopted a Japanese name, Seikon Kanebayashi, but remains a Korean citizen, thus making him a Zainichi Korean.

He began in the newly formed KBO as the pitching coach of the OB Bears from 1982 to 1983. Elevated to manager in 1984, Kim managed the Bears through the 1988 season, making the playoffs twice. He was given the KBO Manager of the Year award in 1986. Kim then moved on to the Pacific Dolphins in 1989-1990, where he won his first playoff series in the 1989 season. Kim managed the Samsung Lions in 1991–1992.

After taking a year off, Kim returned to the KBO in 1994–1995 as a coach for the Haitai Tigers. He was re-hired as a manager in 1996, by the Ssangbangwool Raiders, where he lasted until part-way through the 1999 season.

After being fired by the Raiders, Kim returned to the Lions as a coach in 2000, and to the LG Twins in 2001. Elevated to Twins manager in 2002, Kim took the team to his first Korean Series, where they eventually lost to Samsung four-games-to-two.

Kim returned to Japan in 2005–2006 as a coach for Nippon Professional Baseball's Chiba Lotte Marines.

Kim was hired by the SK Wyverns in 2007 and led the team to victories in the 2007, 2008, and 2010 Korean Series. In 2008, Kim reached the 1,000-victory milestone in the KBO League, only the second manager to ever do so. Between 2009 and 2010, the Wyverns had a 23-game winning streak that ended in April 2010.

In 2011, Kim was ousted near the end of the season after a long-standing disagreement between him and the SK front office. This led to bench coach Lee Man-soo taking over the reins – a move that brought a lot of protests from the SK Wyverns fans, as Kim had led SK to the Korean Series in every year that he had been at the helm.

Immediately after leaving the Wyverns, Kim was hired by Hur Min to manage the independent minor league team the Goyang Wonders, which ended up playing in the KBO Futures League. He managed the team for all three seasons of its existence.

After the disbanding of the Wonders, Kim returned to the KBO in 2015 to manage the Hanwha Eagles. He left a game in 2016 due to dizziness. His stint as the Eagles manager did not yield much success — he was fired by the team in May 2017, 43 games into the 2017 season, with a record of 18 wins and 25 losses.

Controversy 
In 2002, Kim was fined ₩5,000 during that season for a beanball war that erupted between the Twins and Tigers. (The Tigers' manager was similarly fined.) In 2015, after another beanball incident, "Kim was fined ₩3 million for failing to manage the team properly, the first time in KBO history that only one manager was punished in a beanball incident."

KBO League managerial record

References 

Living people
1942 births
Zainichi Korean people
Baseball people from Kyoto
South Korean baseball managers
South Korean baseball coaches
South Korean baseball players
Samsung Lions coaches
LG Twins coaches
Doosan Bears managers
Samsung Lions managers
LG Twins managers
SSG Landers managers
Hyundai Unicorns managers
Hanwha Eagles managers
Nippon Professional Baseball coaches